Hemel Hempstead railway station is on the West Coast Main Line, on the western edge of the town of Hemel Hempstead, Hertfordshire, England. Hemel Hempstead is managed by London Northwestern Railway and all train services are operated by London Northwestern Railway and Southern.

Hemel Hempstead railway station is one of two railway stations now serving the town, the other being Apsley. Both were built when Hemel Hempstead was still small; before it was designated a New Town in 1946 and grew rapidly in size. Bus services run from there to the town centre.

There are four full-length (12 car) through platforms and one disused south-facing bay (on the slow lines).

Ticket Barriers are in operation.

History 
Hemel Hempstead station was opened by the London and Birmingham Railway on 20 July 1837. Originally called Boxmoor station, it was the first terminus of the new line from the south, engineered by Robert Stephenson, which was subsequently extended to Tring in October of the same year and then to Birmingham in 1838. The decision to locate the station  outside Hemel Hempstead town centre was a result of the opposition faced by the L&BR during construction of the line. There were vociferous protests from local landowners who sought to protect their estates from invasion by the "iron horse", including influential figures such as the Earl of Essex (Cassiobury Estate), the Earl of Clarendon (The Grove Estate) and the eminent anatomist Sir Astley Cooper (Gadebridge Estate). Turbulent public meetings were held in Berkhamsted and Watford, and in the House of Lords on 22 June 1832, Lord Brownlow of Ashridge voiced his opposition to "the forcing of the proposed railway through the land and property of so great a proportion of dissentient landowners." In order to obtain Parliamentary approval, the L&BR was forced to choose an alternative route which was less favourable to Hemel Hempstead but satisfied Hertfordshire landowners.

In 1846 the L&BR was taken over by the London and North Western Railway (LNWR). As competition with the rival Midland Railway's new line through Hemel town centre increased, the LNWR operated a horse bus into the town, later replaced by a motor bus service, to poach passengers onto their own, less conveniently placed railway line. In 1912 the LNWR renamed the station Boxmoor and Hemel Hempstead. The LNWR was absorbed into the new London, Midland and Scottish Railway (LMS) in 1923 as part of the Grouping of British railway companies, and in 1930 the Boxmoor and Hemel Hempstead station name was changed to Hemel Hempstead and Boxmoor. Following nationalisation in 1948, the station was under the ownership of the London Midland Region of British Railways; the line was electrified and in 1963 the Boxmoor name was dropped, and the station was simply known as Hemel Hempstead.

The line was opened in 1877 by the Midland Railway and extended to transport coal to Duckhall gasworks, close to Boxmoor. Only occasional freight trains ran this far; passenger trains terminated in the town centre at Heath Park Halt, and there was also a town centre station on the line called Hemel Hempsted. Passenger services ceased on the Nickey Line in 1947 although it remained in use as a goods line.

It was only in the last months of the Nickey Line's operations that a rail link was built at Boxmoor. Hemel Hempstead had been designated as a New Town and the town centre redevelopment plans included the demolition of the Nickey Line. In order to maintain a coal service to the gasworks, a link was built in 1959 connecting the Nickey Line to the West Coast Main Line via sidings at Boxmoor. This link was for goods trains only and no passenger service was ever provided, but it only remained in operation for six months; the gasworks shut down and the link was closed. The following year the railway viaduct over Marlowes in the town centre was demolished, removing Hemel Hempstead's last town centre rail link.

The nearby crossover at Bourne End was the site of a serious accident on 30 September 1945, when a Scottish express derailed after passing over the junction at excessive speed. The coaches rolled down a high embankment, and forty-three people died.

Services

Most services at Hemel Hempstead are operated by London Northwestern Railway, with a limited service operated by Southern.

The typical off-peak service in trains per hour is:
 4 tph to London Euston
 2 tph to 
 2 tph to 

During the peak hours, a number of additional services between London Euston, Tring and  call at the station.

The station is also served by a limited Southern service of two trains per day to and from  via . Prior to May 2022, this service continued to Milton Keynes Central.

On Sundays, the station is served  by a half-hourly service between London Euston and Milton Keynes Central.

Notes

References

Bibliography
The Harpenden to Hemel Hempstead Railway – The Nickey Line. (1996) Sue and Geoff Woodward, Oakwood Press,

External links 

Railway stations in Hertfordshire
DfT Category C2 stations
Former London and Birmingham Railway stations
Railway stations in Great Britain opened in 1837
Railway stations served by West Midlands Trains
Railway stations served by Govia Thameslink Railway
Stations on the West Coast Main Line
Hemel Hempstead